WDBS is a Country formatted broadcast radio station licensed to Sutton, West Virginia, serving Central West Virginia.  WDBS is owned and operated by Summit Media Broadcasting, LLC.

External links
 The Boss 97 FM Online
 

DBS